The Marseille Caper is a 2012 novel by Peter Mayle.

Synopsis
Set in Marseille, and part of the Sam Levitt Capers series, The Marseille Caper follows Sam Lewitt a corporate lawyer turned "fixer" and his interactions with locals amidst a mysterious property deal.

Reception
Writing in The Washington Post, John Wilwol praised the novel as "delightful" while in the Denver Post Tucker Shaw described the book as "like an excellent meal at a beloved restaurant, you’ll savor every morsel, and you’ll be sorry to see it end."

References

2012 novels
Novels set in Marseille
Peter Mayle
Alfred A. Knopf books
Quercus (publisher) books